Amblong (Varavara, Aje) is an Oceanic language spoken in the south of Espiritu Santo Island in Vanuatu.

References

Espiritu Santo languages
Languages of Vanuatu
Definitely endangered languages